The 2018 European Women's Handball Championship was held in France in from 29 November to 16 December 2018. It was the first time France hosts the women's tournament. The matches were played in Brest, Montbéliard, Nancy, Nantes and Paris.

France defeated Russia in the final to claim their first title.

Venues

Qualification

Qualified teams
All 16 qualified teams took part in the previous 2016 championship.

Note: Bold indicates champion for that year. Italic indicates host for that year.

Draw
The draw was held on 12 June 2018 at 12:00 at the Maison de la Radio in Paris, France.

Seedings
The pots were announced on 4 June 2018.

Squads

Referees
12 referee pairs were selected on 4 October 2018.

Preliminary round
All times are local (UTC+1).

Group A

Group B

Group C

Group D

Main round
Points obtained against qualified teams from the same group will be taken over.

Group I

Both matches were scheduled for 8 December, but moved back due to the Yellow vests movement.

Group II

Knockout stage

Bracket

Fifth place game

Semifinals

Third place game

Final

Final ranking and statistics

All Star Team
The All Star Team and awards were announced on 16 December 2018.

Top goalscorers

Top goalkeepers

References

External links
Official website

 
2018
European Championship
European Women's Championship, 2018
Handball, European Championship
European Championship, 2018
International sports competitions hosted by Paris
2018 in Paris
Sport in Metz
Sport in Nancy, France
Sport in Brest, France
Sport in Nantes
November 2018 sports events in Europe
December 2018 sports events in Europe